Thomas Philip Perkins (3 September 1904 – 26 December 1978) was an English professional golfer best known for winning the 1928 Amateur Championship (British Amateur).

Perkins won the Amateur Championship, 6 & 4, over Roger Wethered in May 1928. In August he came to the United States with the 1928 Walker Cup team. The Great Britain team lost to the U.S. team, 11–1. Perkins played Bobby Jones in a singles match, losing 13 & 12. In September 1928, Perkins and Jones met again in the final of the U.S. Amateur. It was the first time that the reigning U.S. Amateur champion (Jones) and Amateur Championship champion (Perkins) met in the final. Jones won the match, 10 & 9.

Perkins stayed in the U.S., living in New York, and turned professional in June 1932, four months after being wounded in a shooting in Florida. Later in June, he finish tied for second in the U.S. Open, after having been the co-leader at the half-way point.

Amateur wins
this list may be incomplete
1927 English Amateur
1928 The Amateur Championship
1931 Long Island Amateur, New York State Amateur

Professional wins
1937 Ohio Open

Major championships

Wins (1)

Results timeline

Note: Perkins never played in the PGA Championship.

LA = Low Amateur
NYF = Tournament not yet founded
NT = No tournament
DNQ = Did not qualify for match play portion
R128, R64, R32, R16, QF, SF = Round in which player lost in match play
"T" indicates a tie for a place

Sources: Masters, U.S. Open and U.S. Amateur, Open Championship, Amateur Championship

Team appearances
Amateur
Walker Cup (representing Great Britain & Ireland): 1928
England–Scotland Amateur Match (representing England): 1927 (tie), 1928 (winners), 1929 (tie)

References

English male golfers
Golfers from New York (state)
1904 births
1978 deaths